Pénélope Julie "Diddie" Vlasto Serpieri (8 August 1903 – 2 March 1985) was a female tennis player from France. She won the silver medal at the Paris Olympics in 1924 in women's singles, losing the final to Helen Wills Moody. Vlasto also won the version of the French national championships in 1924 that was open only to French nationals. She was a doubles partner of Suzanne Lenglen in many doubles tournaments during the early 1920s.

She was born as Pénélope Julie Vlasto on 8 August 1903, in Marseille, France.

According to Wallis Myers of the Daily Telegraph and Daily Mail, Vlasto was ranked in the world top ten in 1923 and 1926, reaching a career high of world No. 8 in 1923.

She married Jean-Baptiste Serpieri on 17 February 1927.

Grand Slam finals

Doubles (2 titles)

Mixed doubles (1 runner-up)

Grand Slam singles tournament timeline

1Through 1923, the French Championships were open only to French nationals. The World Hard Court Championships (WHCC), actually played on clay in Paris or Brussels, began in 1912 and were open to all nationalities. The results from that tournament are shown here for 1923. The Olympics replaced the WHCC in 1924, as the Olympics were held in Paris. Beginning in 1925, the French Championships were open to all nationalities, with the results shown here beginning with that year.

See also 
 Performance timelines for all female tennis players who reached at least one Grand Slam or Olympic singles final

References

External links
 
 

1903 births
1985 deaths
French female tennis players
French people of Greek descent
Olympic tennis players of France
Tennis players at the 1924 Summer Olympics
Olympic silver medalists for France
Olympic medalists in tennis
Chevaliers of the Légion d'honneur
Grand Slam (tennis) champions in women's doubles
Medalists at the 1924 Summer Olympics
French Championships (tennis) champions
20th-century French women